Atractus bocourti, Bocourt's ground snake, is a species of snake in the family Colubridae. The species can be found from Peru to Colombia.

References 

Atractus
Reptiles of Peru
Reptiles of Ecuador
Reptiles of Colombia
Snakes of South America
Reptiles described in 1894
Taxa named by George Albert Boulenger